Elise de Ruijter (born 29 June 1999) is a female sailor from the Netherlands.

She is, with Odile van Aanholt, the 2021 49er FX World Champion and 49er FX European Champion.

References

External links

1999 births
Living people
Dutch female sailors (sport)
49er FX class sailors
World champions in sailing for the Netherlands
49er FX class world champions
People from Leidschendam
21st-century Dutch women